The ANZUK Support Group was established in 1971 to provide Transport and Supply services to Australian, New Zealand and British forces stationed in Singapore and Malaysia as part of ANZUK Force. It was commanded by a Royal Australian Army Service Corps officer and staffed by Australian, New Zealand, United Kingdom personnel and Locally Employed Civilians (LECs). This organisation operated for only a short period. Australia changed Government in 1972 and the incoming Labor Government decided to withdraw Australia’s commitment to the region. This took effect in 1974 and was followed later by the withdrawal of the British forces. It was then decided that New Zealand should form its own Transport Company, designated the New Zealand Transport Company. This was the start of a commitment which was to last until December 1989.

Formation
The NZ Transport Squadron came into being to support the New Zealand Force South East Asia which was to remain in Singapore post the British and Australian withdrawal. In April 1974 E Platoon, 10 Transport Company, RNZASC was formed at Dieppe Barracks as a self-contained and independent Squadron which included:
Headquarters
General Service(GS) Transport Platoon
Coach Platoon
Base Transport Platoon
Supply Platoon
Light Aid Detachment (LAD)

In October 1974 the Company moved from Dieppe Barracks and unofficially changed its name to 18(NZ)Transport Company, this was a tribute to a RNZASC tank transporter company that served in World War II, and the name was frowned upon by the staff in wellington, who insisted that it be referred to as The NZ Transport Company, This would take some time to happen.

Because of the Company's proximity to the NZ Workshop, the LAD was disbanded in 1976.

In 1978 the Coach and Base Transport Platoons were Amalgamated to become the Base Transport Troop.

The New Zealand Army rationalised the supply services in 1979, in line with the 1964 British McLeod Report so that:
The Supply Platoon was transferred to the New Zealand Advanced Ordnance Depot (NZAOD) and its Military personnel re-badged as Royal New Zealand Army Ordnance Corps soldiers:
The RNZASC was disbanded and the Royal New Zealand Corps of Transport (RNZCT) came into being. As part of the changes the Company's name officially became New Zealand Transport Squadron RNZCT.
on 1 April 1984 the unit expanded to include;
New Zealand Force Post Office 5 (NZFPO 5)
Defence Travel Centre (DTC)
Woodlands Base Section
Khatib Officers Mess
Woodlands Warrant Officers and Senior Non Commissioned Officers Mess (WOs & SNCO Mess)
Junior Ranks Club
Mayflower Club
NZ Force Transit Centre (Fernleaf Club)

Organisation
The organisation of the Squadron in 1988–89 was based on a New Zealand Transport Squadron with a few additions to meet the needs of the force. 
Orderly room
Movement Control Unit
Defence Travel Centre
Defence Freight Office
The Fernleaf Centre
Khatib Officers Mess
Woodlands WOs & SNCO Mess
NZFPO 5
GS Troop
1 Section
2 Section
3 Section
Base Transport Troop

Fleet
The New Zealand Transport Squadron fleet consisted of:
Series 2, 2A and 3 Land-rover
Bedford RL trucks
Bedford SB3 FV3198 Buses (White Elephants)

Operations
Although the size of the NZ Transport Squadron remained small, it was always fully committed to supporting NZFORSEA.

Withdrawal
As part of Operation Kupe, the withdrawal of New Zealand forces from Singapore in 1989, and the NZ Transport Squadron was disbanded.

References 

Military units and formations of the New Zealand Army
Army transport units and formations
Company sized units
Military units and formations established in 1974
Military units and formations disestablished in 1989